The 2014 Bucaramanga Open was a professional tennis tournament played on hard courts. It was the fifth edition of the tournament which was part of the 2014 ATP Challenger Tour. It took place in Bucaramanga, Colombia between 20 and 26 January 2014.

Singles main draw entrants

Seeds

 1 Rankings are as of January 13, 2014.

Other entrants
The following players received wildcards into the singles main draw:
  Nicolás Barrientos
  Felipe Mantilla
  Pere Riba
  Juan Carlos Spir

The following players received entry from the qualifying draw:
  Hugo Dellien
  Christopher Díaz Figueroa
  Christian Garin
  Eduardo Struvay

Champions

Singles

 Alejandro Falla def.  Paolo Lorenzi, 7–5, 6–1

Doubles

 Juan Sebastián Cabal /  Robert Farah def.  Kevin King /  Juan-Carlos Spir, 7–6(7–3), 6–3

External links
Official Website

Bucaramanga Open
Seguros Bolívar Open Bucaramanga
Bucaramanga Open